Jhelum Valley is a valley in the Jhelum Valley District of Azad Kashmir. Hattian Bala is the main town and district headquarters of the valley.

Tourist attractions 
Some popular tourist attractions are Garhi Dupatta, Awan Patti, Chinari, Chakothi, Pahal and Chikkar. The valley is connected by a metalled road from Muzaffarabad. 
 
Hotels and rest houses with basic facilities are located in towns and villages in the valley. Health facilities, education institutes, post offices and land-line phone service are also available.

See also 
 Tourism in Azad Kashmir
 Azad Kashmir

References

Populated places in Jhelum Valley District
Tourist attractions in Azad Kashmir
Valleys of Azad Kashmir